Tyler Cole Senerchia (born May 4, 1999) is an American professional wrestler, better known by the ring name Hook (often stylized as HOOK). He is currently signed to All Elite Wrestling (AEW), where he currently holds the FTW Championship, a title established by his father Taz, in his first reign.

Professional wrestling career

All Elite Wrestling (2020-present)
On the December 16, 2020 episode of AEW Dynamite, Senerchia, under the ring name Hook, made his first appearance in All Elite Wrestling as a heel, aligning himself with Team Taz (Taz, Brian Cage, Ricky Starks and Powerhouse Hobbs). On December 8, 2021, Hook made his professional wrestling debut against Fuego Del Sol for an episode of AEW Rampage which aired two days later. Hook won the match by submission with a half nelson choke called Redrum. Shortly after the match aired, Tony Khan announced that Hook had signed a contract with the company. Hook's debut, which had become an internet meme prior to the match, garnered praise from critics, with several praising his level of skill despite being a rookie. Two weeks later, Hook would quickly defeat Bear Bronson at AEW Rampage: Holiday Bash. His next match would be a win over Aaron Solo, which would begin a feud with Q. T. Marshall. The feud would culminate with Hook defeating Marshall at AEW Revolution: The Buy In on March 6, 2022. Since May, Hook began to work with Danhausen. On July 27 at Fight for the Fallen, Hook defeated Ricky Starks for the FTW Championship, a title established by his father in the promotion Extreme Championship Wrestling (ECW) and reintroduced in AEW.

Professional wrestling style and persona 
Hook's finisher, named Redrum, is a half nelson choke (also known as a kata ha jime), the same as his father's finisher, the Tazmission. He has been nicknamed "The Cold-Hearted Handsome Devil".

Hook uses the Action Bronson song "The Chairman's Intent" from the album Blue Chips 7000 as his entrance theme.

Personal life 
Senerchia is the son of professional wrestler Peter Senerchia, known professionally as Taz. He is of Italian descent.

Senerchia played lacrosse at Plainedge High School, garnering all-state honors and being ranked 74th in the nation by Inside Lacrosse. In 2018, Senerchia served as a long-stick midfielder for the Bucknell Bison men's lacrosse team; he subsequently transferred to the Sacred Heart Pioneers.

Championships and accomplishments 

 All Elite Wrestling
 FTW Championship (1 time, current)
Pro Wrestling Illustrated
 Rookie of the Year (2022)
Ranked No. 124 of the top 500 singles wrestlers in the PWI 500 in 2022

References

External links 
 
 

1999 births
Living people
All Elite Wrestling personnel
American male professional wrestlers
Bucknell Bison men's lacrosse players
Lacrosse midfielders
Lacrosse players from New York (state)
People from Massapequa, New York
Professional wrestlers from New York (state)
Sacred Heart Pioneers men's lacrosse players
Sportspeople from Nassau County, New York
American people of Italian descent
21st-century professional wrestlers
Professional wrestlers from New York City
FTW Champions